Ruslan is a masculine given name mainly popular among Turkic (Turkish, Azerbaijani), North Caucasian (Avar, Chechen, Lezgi, Cherkes, Ossetians) and some East Slavic people. The name is an old Azeri/Caucasian Albanian variant of the Turkic word arslan or aslan – meaning lion. The name is derived from Arslan, Eruslan (also Uruslan, Eruslane, Yeruslan), another earlier Tatar variant of the word. The name became popular through the folk tale hero Yeruslan Lazarevich (originally Uruslan). It is also a masculine given name in Indonesia and Malaysia; a common variant in these countries is "Roslan". The name is also popular in Russia, Ukraine, Azerbaijan and Belarus.

The feminine version is Ruslana.

Fictional character
Ruslan and Ludmila, 1820 poem by Alexander Pushkin about Ruslan, a legendary 11th-century hero. For more see Ruslan and Ludmila (disambiguation).
 Ruslan the guard dog, the protagonist of Faithful Ruslan by Georgi Vladimov
Yeruslan Lazarevich, Russian folk tale hero of Tatar origin

People with the given name Ruslan
• Ruslan Khairov (1981 Dagestan  born) Azerbaijani boxer
Ruslan Abdulgani (1914 - 2005), Indonesian diplomat and Foreign Minister (1956-1957)
Ruslan Abışov (born 1987), Azerbaijani footballer
Ruslan Agalarov (born 1974), Uzbekistani football manager
Ruslan Akhmadullin (born 1982), Russian ice hockey player of Tatar origin
Ruslan Alekhno (born 1981), Russian and Belarusian singer
Ruslan Aushev (born 1954), Soviet General and former President of Ingushetia
Ruslan Baltiev (born 1978), Kazakh footballer
Ruslan Beslaneyev (born 1982), Russian footballer
Ruslan Chagaev, an Uzbekistani professional boxer of Tatar ethnic origin
Ruslan Fedotenko (born 1979), Ukrainian professional hockey player
Ruslan Gelayev (1964 - 2004),  commander in the Chechen separatist movement against Russia
Ruslan Goncharov, Ukrainian figure skater
Ruslan Kapantsow (born 1981), Belarusian footballer
Ruslan Karaev (born 1983), a Russian kickboxer and martial artist
Ruslan Khasbulatov (1942 - 2023), a Russian economist and politician
Ruslan Kogan (b. 1982), founder and director of Kogan Technologies
Ruslan Lyubarskyi (born 1973), Ukrainian footballer
Ruslan Majidov (born 1985), Azerbaijani footballer
Ruslan Malinovskyi (born 1993), Ukrainian footballer
Ruslan Mashchenko (born 1971), a Russian hurdler
Ruslan Maynov (born 1976), Bulgarian singer
Ruslan Medzhitov, Professor of Immunobiology at Yale University
Ruslan Mingazow (1991), Turkmenistani footballer
Ruslan Nurudinov (born 1991), an Uzbekistani weightlifter of Tatar ethnic origin 
Ruslan Pidhornyy (born 1977), Ukrainian road bicycle racer
Ruslan Ponomariov (born 1983), a Ukrainian chess player and former FIDE world champion
Ruslan Provodnikov (born 1984), a Russian boxer
Ruslan Rotan (born 1981), a Ukrainian football player
Ruslan Salei (1974 – 2011), a Belarusian professional hockey defenceman
Ruslan Sirota (born 1980), a jazz, fusion and funk/R&B pianist and keyboardist
Ruslan Yamadayev (1961–2008), a Chechen military leader and politician
Ruslan Zakharov (b. 1987), Russian speed skater

See also
Aslan (disambiguation)
Arslan
Ruslan (disambiguation)
Ruslan and Ludmila (disambiguation)

References

Sources

 
 
 
 
 
 
 
 
 
 

Tatar-language masculine given names
Bashkir-language masculine given names
Kazakh masculine given names
Russian masculine given names
Ukrainian masculine given names
Belarusian masculine given names
Indonesian masculine given names